Buchenwald is the fifth album by Whitehouse released in 1981 by Come Organisation (later reissued by Susan Lawly).

Overview
As is common in many early Whitehouse recordings, there is a high pitched feedback sound throughout the entire album, except for a brief pause in the title track "Buchenwald". It also uses a distinct, electronic horn-like sound. The track, "Dedicated to Albert de Salvo - Sadist and Mass Slayer" refers to the Boston Strangler, which like the song, "Dedicated to Peter Kürten", from their previous album, is an instrumental track.

Buchenwald was originally limited to 500 copies on vinyl on the group-owned record label Come Organisation. It was later reissued by the group's second record label, Susan Lawly on compact disc in 1996.

Track listing

"Buchenwald" – 12:21
"Dedicated to Albert de Salvo - Sadist and Mass Slayer" – 4:10
"Incest 2" – 4:00
"The Days at Florbelle" – 4:18

Personnel 

 William Bennett – synthesizers, production
 Peter McKay – production
 Denis Blackham – mastering
 George Peckham – mastering

References

External links
Buchenwald at Susan Lawly
Whitehouse 1981-1982 recording dossier at Susan Lawly

Whitehouse (band) albums
1981 albums
Cultural depictions of Albert DeSalvo